Tresfjord or Tresfjorden may refer to:

Tresfjord, a former municipality in Møre og Romsdal county, Norway (known as Sylte from 1899 to 1922)
Tresfjord (village), a village in Vestnes municipality, Møre og Romsdal county, Norway
Tresfjorden, a fjord in Vestnes municipality, Møre og Romsdal county, Norway
Tresfjord Church, a church in Vestnes municipality, Møre og Romsdal county, Norway
Tresfjord Bridge, a bridge in Vestnes municipality, Møre og Romsdal county, Norway